Invergloy Platform was a railway station in Inverness-shire, Scotland on the Invergarry and Fort Augustus Railway between 1904 and 1933.

Overview 
The station was opened on 1 July 1904 on the Invergarry and Fort Augustus Railway which had opened 12 months previously. It was a single platform with a waiting shelter and was sometimes known as Invergloy Station. The station was operated by the Highland Railway from 1904 to 1907, and then by the North British Railway until 1922. From 1923 it was operated by the London and North Eastern Railway.

It was expanded with two sidings put in for timber traffic during the First World War.

It closed on 1 December 1933.

References

External links
 Invergloy Platform station on navigable O. S. map

  
  

Disused railway stations in Highland (council area)
Former North British Railway stations
Railway stations in Great Britain opened in 1904
Railway stations in Great Britain closed in 1911
Railway stations in Great Britain opened in 1913
Railway stations in Great Britain closed in 1933